Rudy Jansen (born 2 January 1979) is a Dutch former footballer who played as a defender. His former clubs are FC Utrecht, Heracles Almelo, Excelsior, SC Cambuur, FC Zwolle and Spakenburg.

Honours
Heracles Almelo
 Eerste Divisie: 2004–05

References

1979 births
Living people
Footballers from Utrecht (city)
Association football defenders
Dutch footballers
Excelsior Rotterdam players
FC Utrecht players
Heracles Almelo players
SC Cambuur players
PEC Zwolle players
SV Spakenburg players
Eredivisie players
Eerste Divisie players